Mr. Moonlight is the eighth studio album by British-American rock band Foreigner, released by Arista Records in Europe on 23 October and by BMG Entertainment in Japan on 23 November 1994. In the United States and Canada, it appeared in early 1995 on the Rhythm Safari label. Recorded at seven different studios across the States, the album was produced by Mick Jones, Lou Gramm, and Mike Stone, with an additional production by Phil and Joe Nicolo. It was Foreigner's last studio release until Can't Slow Down (2009).

The album was the first since Inside Information (1987) and appeared to be the final to date full-length release with original lead singer Lou Gramm, who had left the group in 1990 but returned two years later. Prior to starting work on Mr. Moonlight, he was the lead vocalist on three newly recorded tracks from Foreigner's compilation The Very Best ... and Beyond (1992). Mr. Moonlight was also the first album in fifteen years without bass guitarist Rick Wills, who joined the band in 1979, and drummer Dennis Elliott, who was a founding member.

Supposed to be a comeback release, Mr. Moonlight was a commercial disappointment, only peaking at number 136 in the Billboard 200 chart, and ranked as Foreigner's worst-selling studio album.

Track listing

Personnel 
Foreigner
 Mick Jones – acoustic piano, guitars, backing vocals
 Lou Gramm – lead vocals, backing vocals, percussion
 Jeff Jacobs – acoustic piano, organ, keyboards, backing vocals
 Bruce Turgon – bass, backing vocals
 Mark Schulman – drums, backing vocals

Additional musicians
 Randy Cantor – keyboards and additional guitars (on "White Lie" and "Rain")
 Duane Eddy – lead guitar (on "Until the End of Time")
 Billy Bremner – additional guitars (on "All I Need to Know")
 Luis Enriques – percussion (on "Real World" and "Running the Risk")
 Scott Gilman – saxophone, recorder, backing vocals
 Ian Lloyd – backing vocals
 Tawatha Agee – backing vocals (on "I Keep Hoping")
 Robin Clark – backing vocals (on "I Keep Hoping")
 Paulette McWilliams – backing vocals (on "I Keep Hoping")

Production 
 Mick Jones – producer 
 Lou Gramm – producer 
 Mike Stone – producer, engineer, mixing (at Bearsville Studios in Bearsville, New York, and Soundtrack Studios in New York, New York)
 Phil and Joe Nicolo – additional production, mixing ("White Lie" and "Rain", at Studio 4 in Philadelphia, Pennsylvania)
 David Bianco – mixing ("Real World")
 Mark Stebbeds – mixing ("Big Dog", at Track Record Studios in North Hollywood, California)
 Ted Jensen – mastering (at Sterling Studios in New York, New York)
 Danny Clinch – photography
 John Pitter – illustrations
 Red Herring Design – design

Charts

References

External links
The Official Foreigner Website

Foreigner (band) albums
1994 albums
Arista Records albums
Albums produced by Mike Stone (record producer)
Albums produced by Mick Jones (Foreigner)